Loyola Jesuit College is a private Catholic secondary boarding school, located in Gidan Mangoro, Abuja, Nigeria. The school was founded by the Society of Jesus on October 2, 1996, and is named after the Society's founder, St. Ignatius of Loyola. The school has consistently ranked at the top of Nigerian schools in the WAEC exams.

Campus and history
Loyola Jesuit College is located on a  site in the village of Gidan Mangoro. Funds to construct the school were provided by the New York province of the Society of Jesus and the United States Agency for International Development, Office of American Schools and Hospitals Abroad. The ceremonial laying of foundation stone took place on April 1, 1995 and was presided over by the Honorable Walter Carrington, the then US Ambassador to Nigeria. He described the site as a "field of dreams". The school opened with 101 students on October 2, 1996.

Sosoliso plane crash
On December 10, 2005, Loyola Jesuit College lost 60 students in the crash of Sosoliso Airlines Flight 1145, which killed 107 people. One of the two survivors was Kechi Okwuchi, a Loyola student. A new multi-purpose auditorium, Memorial Hall, memorializes the students who died in the crash.

Administration

Presidents

Principals

Notable alumni

 Iyinoluwa AboyejiAndela co-founder,
 Emmanuel Bez Idakulasinger, songwriter
 Kechi Okwuchione of the two survivors of the Sosoliso Airlines Flight 1145 crash and finalist in the twelfth season of America's Got Talent

See also 

 Catholic Church in Nigeria
 Education in Nigeria
 List of Jesuit schools

References

External links 
Official website

Jesuit secondary schools in Nigeria
Secondary schools in the Federal Capital Territory (Nigeria)
Educational institutions established in 1996
1996 establishments in Nigeria
Schools in Abuja